Greenacre, a suburb of local government areas City of Canterbury-Bankstown and the Municipality of Strathfield, is located 20 kilometres south-west of the Sydney central business district in the state of New South Wales, Australia, and is a part of the South-western Sydney region.

History
This area was previously known as East Bankstown. When the first road went through the area, an acre of land was cleared for cultivation. The contrast to its surrounding area led to it being referred to as the 'Green Acre'. In 1909, Greenacre Park Estate became one of the first subdivisions in the area. Michael Ryan operated an inn called the Harp of Ould Erin on land he owned to the north of Liverpool Road.

The eastern part of the suburb, east of Roberts Road and north of Juno Parade, was mostly part of the large logistical and industrial area surrounding Enfield Marshalling Yards, with a small residential area. This area was incorporated into Enfield Council in 1889, and transferred to Strathfield Council in 1949 along with the western ward of Enfield Council (most of which is now Strathfield South).

A separate part of the suburb, north of Liverpool Road (Hume Highway), is also railway and industrial land, and was added to Strathfield Council in 1892.

Population
At the 2016 census, there were 24,373 residents in Greenacre. The median age was 33 years old and 24.3% of the population was aged 14 years and under. 53.3% of people were born in Australia. The most common other countries of birth were Lebanon 13.9%, Vietnam 2.1%, South Korea 2.0%, Pakistan 1.5% and Italy 1.4%. The most common ancestries were Lebanese 30.7%, Australian 10.4%, English 7.1%, Italian 4.0% and Chinese 3.4%. 25.6% of people spoke only English at home. Other languages spoken at home included Arabic 41.1%, Greek 3.4%, Vietnamese 2.9%, Urdu 2.6% and Korean 2.6%. The most common responses for religion were Islam 42.1% and Catholic 22.4%. The median household income of $1,184 was lower than the national figure of $1,438.

Commercial area
The suburb is distinctly but unofficially split into the north and the south. The southern parts of Greenacre are serviced by a strip of local independent shops and outlets along Waterloo Road and around the intersection of Juno Parade and Boronia Road. Businesses in the northern parts of Greenacre are often identified with neighbouring Chullora, such as Chullora Market Place. A larger shopping centre, Bankstown Central, is located in neighbouring Bankstown.

Transport
The suburb is not connected to a railway station, but is serviced by various bus and coach services that operate along the main roads and various smaller roads. Buses operate to and from Strathfield station, Burwood station, Punchbowl station, Lakemba station and Bankstown station.

The eastern edge of Greenacre is defined by the Enfield Marshalling Yards and Punchbowl Road, the western limit is Rookwood Road and Stacey Street, the northern limit is Liverpool Road and Brunker Road, and the southern limit is Wattle Street. Other main roads through the suburb include Waterloo Road, Juno Parade, Boronia Road and Highview Avenue.

Churches
Good Shepherd Anglican Church (80 Pandora St), St John Vianney Catholic Church,  Greenacre Uniting Church, Greenacre Baptist Church, Greenacre Church of Christ, Sydney Full Gospel Korean Church, St John's Melkite Catholic Church.

Schools
Greenacre is the site of three public primary schools, Chullora Public School, Banksia Road Primary School and Greenacre Public School. Greenacre also has various private schools such as Greenacre Baptist Christian Community School, St John Vianneys Primary School, Holy Saviour Catholic School, Al Noori Muslim School, Malek Fahd Islamic School, An Nahyan Islamic School and Sydney Full Gospel Church School.

Sport and recreation
 Greenacre's Rugby League club are known as the "Tigers". The Greenacre Tigers are based at Roberts Park.
 Greenacre has a Bowls Club on Roberts Road and an RSL Club.
 Greenacre Area Community Centre - 87 Waterloo Rd, Greenacre - offers a variety of recreational services such as children's art classes, yoga, gentle exercise and line dancing.
Greenacre has three soccer clubs which are Chullora Wolves, East Bankstown and Greenacre Eagles.
 Greenacre Library and Knowledge Centre - Community Pl, Greenacre - it includes a public library, youth centre and community centre.
Greenacre Pool - off Banksia Rd - closed 2016 due to structural issues.
Greenacre YMCA located on Waterloo Rd - closed in 2016, due to lack of funding.

Parks
 Northcote Park - Cnr Waterloo Rd & Northcote Rd, Greenacre
Roberts Park - 105 Waterloo Rd, Greenacre
 Allum Park - entrance off Maiden St, Greenacre
 Lockwood Park - 352 Waterloo Rd, Greenacre
 Gosling Park - 103 Chiswick Rd, Greenacre
 Greenacre Heights Reserve - entrances off Greenacre Rd, Hillcrest Ave, and Konrad Ave
 Bromley Reserve - entrances off Bromley Ave and Mimosa Rd
 Mimosa Reserve - 54 Mimosa Rd, Greenacre
 Norm Nelson Reserve - 239A Roberts Rd, Greenacre 
 Lee Park - 41 Russell St, Greenacre 
 Norfolk Reserve is bounded by Chullora Marketplace and Norfolk Village.

Popular culture
 The SBS television series Pizza was filmed in a pizza shop on the Hume Highway at Greenacre. A movie was also made in 2003 based on the same characters called Fat Pizza: The Movie. The shop in Greenacre had been renamed 'Fat Pizza', which was the name used in the TV series and movie. The business has since closed.

 The house at 128 Greenacre Road, Greenacre is depicted as a building site in the 1966 film They're a Weird Mob, where cast members can be seen digging trenches and pouring concrete for footings.

References

External links

Suburbs of Sydney
City of Canterbury-Bankstown
Hume Highway
Municipality of Strathfield
Muslim enclaves